Haplogroup V is a human mitochondrial DNA (mtDNA) haplogroup. The clade is believed to have originated over 14,000 years ago in Southern Europe.

Origin
Haplogroup V derives from the HV0a subclade of haplogroup HV. In 1998 it was argued that V spread over Europe from an Ice Age refuge in Iberia. However more recent estimates of the date of V would place it in the Neolithic.

Distribution
Haplogroup V is a relatively rare mtDNA haplogroup, occurring in around 4% of native Europeans. Its highest concentration is among the Saami people of northern Fennoscandia (~59%). It has been found at a frequency of approximately 10% among the Maris of the Volga-Ural region, leading to the suggestion that this region might be the source of the V among the Saami. Haplogroup V has been observed at higher than average levels among Cantabrian people (15%) of northern Iberia, and among the adjacent Basque (10.4%).

Haplogroup V is also found in parts of Northwest Africa. It is mainly concentrated among the Tuareg inhabiting the Gorom-Gorom area in Burkina Faso (21%), Sahrawi in the Western Sahara (17.9%), and Berbers of Matmata, Tunisia (16.3%). The rare V7a subclade occurs among Algerians in Oran (1.08%) and Reguibate Sahrawi (1.85%).

Ancient DNA
MtDNA haplogroup V has been reported in Neolithic remains of the Linear Pottery culture at Halberstadt,  Germany c. 5000 BC and Derenburg Meerenstieg, Germany c. 4910 BC. Haplogroup V7 was found in representative Maykop culture samples in the excavations conducted by Alexei Rezepkin. Haplogroup V has been detected in representatives Trypil'ska and Unetice culture.

Haplogroup V has also been found among Iberomaurusian specimens dating from the Epipaleolithic at the Taforalt prehistoric site 14,000 years BP.

Haplogroup V has also been found among Somogyvár-Vinkovci culture specimens dating from the Bronze Age from Western Hungary https://www.biorxiv.org/content/10.1101/2022.02.03.478968v1.full.pdf

Tree
This phylogenetic tree of haplogroup V subclades is based on the paper by Mannis van Oven and Manfred Kayser Updated comprehensive phylogenetic tree of global human mitochondrial DNA variation and subsequent published research.

V
V1
V1a  found mostly from central to northeast Europe
V1a1 found in Scandinavia (including Lapland), Finland and Baltic countries
V1a2 found in Bronze Age Poland
V1b
V2 found in the British Isles
V2a  found in Ireland
V2a1
V2a1a
V2b  found in England
V2b1
V2c found in England
V3 found in northwest Europe / found in Late Neolithic Hungary (Bell Beaker)
V3b
V3c found in northern, central and eastern Europe
V4  found in France
V5  found in Lapland
V6 found in northwest Europe
V7
V7a found mostly in Slavic countries, but also in Scandinavia, Germany and France
V7b found in eastern Europe and France
V8  found in North Europe
V9
V9a found in the British Isles
V9a1
V9a2
V10 found in the British Isles, northwest France and Sweden / found in Bell Beaker Scotland
V10a
V10b found in EBA England
V11 
V12 found in Germany
V14  found in Poland and Iberia
V15  found in England, Norway and Armenia
V15a
V16 found in Britain, Germany and Denmark
V17 found in England / found in Late Neolithic France
V18 found in the Netherlands, Germany and Italy
V19
V20 found in Norway
V21
V22
V23
V24
V25 found in South Europe
V26
V27
V28
V29
V30
V31
V32
V33
V34
V35
V36
V37
V38
V39
V40
V41
V42
V43
V44
V45
V46
V47
V48
V49
V50
V51
V52
V53
V54
V55
V56
V57
V58
V59
V60
V61
V62
V63
V64
V65
V66
V67
V68
V69
V70
V71
V72
V73
V74
V75
V76
V77
V78

See also 

Benjamin Franklin
Velda
Genealogical DNA test
Genetic genealogy
Human mitochondrial genetics
Population genetics
Human mitochondrial DNA haplogroups

References

External links 
General
Ian Logan's Mitochondrial DNA Site: V
Mannis van Oven's Phylotree
Haplogroup V
Family Tree DNA Project:  mtDNA Haplogroup V
Danish Demes Regional DNA Project:  mtDNA Haplogroup V

V